"Love Lights the World" is song written by David Foster and Linda Thompson, and produced by Foster. It was included on the Foster's Japan-only released album, Love Lights the World. The song was released on 4 April 1994 as the first and only single from the album by 143 and Atlantic Records.

Background and release
Between 26 April and 1 May 1994, Foster performed a series of concerts in Tokyo and Osaka, Japan called JT Super Producer, that culminated with a 90-minute TV special. Foster was honored as a music producer and performed with artists he had worked with. He was joined by Celine Dion, Peabo Bryson, Color Me Badd, Warren Wiebe, Wendy Moten, Jay Graydon and Anri.

On 10 April 1994, Foster released Love Lights the World album in Japan only, where it reached number 29 on the Oricon chart. It included mostly instrumental tracks and the title song performed by Dion, Bryson and Color Me Badd. The latter was also released as a single in Japan at the same time. "Love Lights the World" reunited Dion and Bryson, who recorded "Beauty and the Beast" together in 1991. Foster's Japanese concerts also reunited Dion and Wiebe, who recorded the song "Listen to Me", featured in the 1989 movie Listen to Me.

Formats and track listings
Japanese CD single
"Love Lights the World" (featuring Celine Dion, Peabo Bryson, and Color Me Badd) – 5:15
"Winter Games" (Instrumental) – 4:03
"Is There a Chance" (featuring Warren Wiebe) – 4:58
"Love Theme from St. Elmo's Fire" (Instrumental) – 3:27

References

1990s ballads
143 Records singles
1994 singles
1994 songs
Atlantic Records singles
Celine Dion songs
Peabo Bryson songs
Color Me Badd songs
Pop ballads
Song recordings produced by David Foster
Songs written by David Foster
Songs written by Linda Thompson (actress)